Cameron Lake is a lake in central Vancouver Island located 15 km east of Port Alberni, on the north side of Highway 4. It has an area of 477 hectares and an elevation of 184 metres above sea level. The lake is between Mount Arrowsmith to the south and Mount Wesley to the north.  The lake was named by Captain Richards in 1860 for David Cameron, the first Chief Justice of Vancouver Island.

The entire southern shore of the lake is incorporated in the Little Qualicum Falls Provincial Park

A popular folktale is that a train came crashing down the mountain from the Island Rail Corridor, this however is false.

Reports of peculiar sightings in the lake's waters and the local legend of resident lake monster, nicknamed Cammie, remain popular.

In the summer of 2009, the B.C. Cryptozoology Club was not able to identify the source of earlier sightings of what may have been a large trout or something larger leading to speculation about some sort of sea serpent. In February 2016 researcher John Kirk and his team detected something big in the water, however, their underwater camera became detached. Kirk speculates the mysterious lake creature could be a giant sturgeon, a huge eel or a massive salamander.

References

External links 

 Cameron Lake, Central British Columbia, Canada - britishcolumbia.com
 Cameron Lake - Google Maps

Alberni Valley
Lakes of Vancouver Island
Mid Vancouver Island
Cameron Land District